Tobias Steinhauser (born 27 January 1972) is a German former professional cyclist. He is the brother-in-law of Jan Ullrich. 

Steinhauser lives together with his wife and three children in Scheidegg, Bavaria.
After his professional career he became one of the co-developers of Jan Ullrich Bikes.

Major results

1994
 1st Overall Tour de Slovénie
1995
 1st Overall Giro delle Regioni
1st Stage 5
 4th Overall Circuit Cycliste Sarthe
 6th Overall Regio-Tour
1999
 3rd Overall Tour de Luxembourg
 6th Trofeo Pantalica
2000
 1st Overall Hessen Rundfahrt
 1st Giro del Lago Maggiore
 1st Overall Rapport Toer
1st Stage 3 (ITT)
 3rd Overall Bayern Rundfahrt
 5th Road race, UCI Road World Championships
2001
 9th Overall Paris–Nice
2002
 1st Stage 9 Tour de Suisse
 3rd Overall Deutschland Tour

Grand Tour general classification results timeline

References

External links 
 Official homepage
 Jan Ullrich Bikes
 
 Tobias Steinhauser's profile at Cycling Base

1972 births
Living people
People from Lindenberg im Allgäu
Sportspeople from Swabia (Bavaria)
German male cyclists
Tour de Suisse stage winners
Cyclists from Bavaria